Sir Ronald Henry Amherst Storrs  (19 November 1881 – 1 November 1955) was an official in the British Foreign and Colonial Office. He served as Oriental Secretary in Cairo, Military Governor of Jerusalem, Governor of Cyprus, and Governor of Northern Rhodesia.

Biography
Ronald Storrs was the eldest son of John Storrs, priest of the Church of England and later Dean of Rochester. His mother was Lucy Anna Maria Cockayne-Cust, sister of the fifth Baron Brownlow.

Storrs was educated at Charterhouse School and Pembroke College, Cambridge, where he gained a first-class degree in the Classical Tripos.

Foreign service

Egypt
Storrs entered the Finance Ministry of the Egyptian Government in 1904, five years later becoming Oriental Secretary to the British Agency, succeeding Harry Boyle in this post. In 1917 Storrs became Political Officer representing the Egyptian Expeditionary Force in Mesopotamia as Liaison officer for the Anglo-French mission in Baghdad and Mesopotamia where he met Gertrude Bell and Sir Percy Cox.

T. E. Lawrence commented in Seven Pillars of Wisdom:

"The first of all of us was Ronald Storrs, Oriental Secretary of the Residency, the most brilliant Englishman in the Near East, and subtly efficient, despite his diversion of energy in love of music and letters, of sculpture, painting, of whatever was beautiful in the world's fruit... Storrs was always first, and the great man among us".
Storrs is credited with a classic example of British understatement when referring to the behaviour of the British toward the many tribal and regional leaders that the British were trying to influence in "The Great Game": "we deprecated the imperative, preferring instead the subjunctive or even, wistfully, the optative mood".

During the First World War Storrs was a member of the Arab Bureau and a participant in the negotiations between the Sharif Husayn and the British government and in the organisation of the Arab Revolt. His own personal positions were that the Sharif Husayn was asking for more Arab territory than he had any right to, and that Syria and Palestine should be incorporated into a British-sponsored Egyptian Empire as a replacement for the Ottoman Empire, a plan which was never implemented. Storrs is thought to have underestimated Arab Muslim resistance to non-Muslim rule.

Palestine

In 1917 Storrs became Military Governor of Jerusalem, within the Occupied Enemy Territory Administration, for which purpose he was given the British Army rank of colonel. He claimed to be "the first military governor of Jerusalem since Pontius Pilate". He was in fact the second British military governor of Jerusalem, succeeding Brigadier General Neville Travers Borton, also known as Borton Pasha, who resigned after two weeks due to ill health. In 1921 he became Civil Governor of Jerusalem and Judea. In both positions he attempted to support Zionism while protecting the rights of the Arab inhabitants of Palestine, and thus earned the hostility of both sides. He devoted much of his time to cultural matters, including town planning, and to the Pro-Jerusalem Society, a cultural organisation that he founded. Storrs acted as President of the Society.

In 1919, Storrs was appointed a Commander of the Order of the Crown of Italy.

Palestine's first chess club was the International Chess Club founded in Jerusalem in 1918 by Storrs. International Chess Club was an expression of the hope that it  would unite the different nations – local Arabs and Jews, and European Christians of various nations who were then stationed in the city – and help promote peace and understanding. The club closed within a year  due to the increasing tensions between the Arabs and Jews. A chess enthusiast, Storrs also helped to organise in 1919 the city's first championship which was won by Shaul Gordon, the founder of Mercantile Bank.

Cyprus and Rhodesia
From 1926 to 1932 Storrs was Governor and Commander-in-Chief of Cyprus, a period which included an attempted revolt (1931) during which Government House was burned to the ground. He was then appointed Governor of Northern Rhodesia in 1932. He retired for health reasons in 1934, at the age of 53.

Later years

Storrs was one of the six pallbearers at the funeral of T. E. Lawrence in 1935.

In 1937 he published his memoirs Orientations (US edition The Memoirs of Sir Ronald Storrs). Between 1937 and 1945 he served on the London County Council, and during the Second World War he broadcast for the Ministry of Information. He died in 1955, aged 73, and is buried at St John the Baptist Church, Pebmarsh, Essex.

References

Bibliography

Writings
 (limited edition of 128 copies)

Storrs, Ronald, Dunlop in War and Peace (Hutchinson & Co., 1946) - an account of the Dunlop Company and the importance of Dunlop's production during the Second World War.

Sources

External links 

 
 
Memoirs of Sir Ronald Storrs at Internet Archive.

1881 births
1955 deaths
Administrators of Palestine
Alumni of Pembroke College, Cambridge
British Army General List officers
British Army personnel of World War I
British philhellenes
Commanders of the Order of the British Empire
Governors of British Cyprus
Governors of Northern Rhodesia
Members of London County Council
Knights Commander of the Order of St Michael and St George
People educated at Charterhouse School
Ottoman Empire in World War I